is a Japanese composer, arranger and guitarist from agency Being Inc.

In 1991, he debuted as a composer for Japanese rock band Wands debut single's b-side track Stray Cat.

In years 1995-2001, he was member of power-pop unit Pamelah as a composer, arranger, keyboardist, music sequencer and guitarist. During time he constantly provided music for artist as Kaori Nanao, Kondo Fusanosuke, Zard or Field of View. As leader of Pamelah, he produced over 14 singles and 5 studio albums.

Since disband he continued providing music for various artist including U-ka Saegusa in dB, Azumi Uehara, Aiko Kitahara or Rina Aiuchi.

He's active as of 2020.

List of provided works

Composer

Wands
Stray Cat (b-side from single "Sabishisa wa Aki no Iro")

Zard
Ai ga Mienai

Kaori Nanao
Kaito, Uso, Mahiru no Yami (from album "Hajimari no Uta")

Azumi Uehara
Tear Drop (from album "Mushoku")
First Love (from album "Ikitakuwanai Bokura)

Aiko Kitahara
Himawari no Youni
Yume nara Samenaide (b-side from single "Nijiiro ni Hikaru Umi")
Special Days!
Kindan no Kajitsu, Yuki Furu Yoru wa Dakishimete, Ame no Naka (from album Piece of Love)
Ano Koro no Kimi de Ite (from album Message)
Daijoubu (b-side from single "Mou Ichido Kimi ni Koishiteru")
Season (from album Sea)
Sakura Saku (b-side from single "Sekaijuu Doko wo Sagashitemo")
Koihanabi (from album Shanti)

U-ka Saegusa in dB
Kimi to Yakusoku Shita Yasashii Ano Basho made, I can't see, I can't feel (from album U-ka saegusa IN db 1st ~Kimi to Yakusoku Shita Yasashii Ano Basho made~)
Atsui Jounetsu Dakishimete
Dandan Kimi no Egao ga Tookunatteiku
Precious Memories, Kanashii Ame ga Furitsuzuite mo, Zutto Zutto Kimi no Koibito de Itai (from album U-ka saegusa IN db IV ~Crystal na Kisetsu ni Miserarete~)

Shiori Takei
Sweet Home

Sayuri Iwata
Sayonara to
15
First Love
Harukaze
Kotoba

Crush Tears
Mad Love

B.B.Queens
Let's Go, Girl!

NMB48
Prom no Koibito

SKE48
Futari dake no Parade
Aishiteraburu

AKB48
Mitsu no Namida
Itsuka Mita Umi no Soko
Boy Hunt no Houhou Oshiemasu

Shiori Niiyama
17Sai no Natsu

Jang Keun-suk
Don't be Afraid, Dakishimetai, Kawaita Kiss, Going Crazy (from album Voyage)

Band-Maid
Arcadia Girl

Arranger

Yumiko Morishita
Itsumademo Lovin' You, Looking For True Love, Mou Hitotsu no Mirai, Motto Zutto Chikaku ni Kanjitai (from album Kick Off!)

Field of View
Kawaita Sakebi

Chika Yoshida
Kamusharana Ai

Aika Ohno
Easy Game

Rina Aiuchi
STEP UP!, Girl's Play (Playgirl)
Akaku Atsui Kodou
Sugao no mama
Thanx
Time

Sayuri Iwata
Sayonara to
Ashita wa Kyou yori Waratteiraremasuyouni
Harukaze
Kotoba

Pinc Inc
Motto Kimiiro ni Somaritai

Mai Kuraki
Puzzle
Future Kiss
Another day＊another world

La PomPon
Nazo

Shiori Niiyama
Mou Ikanakucha (from album Finder no Mukou)

References

External links
Official Site
Old Official Site (WebArchived)
Musicbrainz
Being Creators profile
Masazumi Ozawa Discography at Discogs

1965 births
Being Inc. artists
Japanese composers
Japanese male composers
Japanese music arrangers
Japanese guitarists
Living people